Lagueruela is a municipality located in the province of Teruel, Aragon, Spain. According to the 2010 census the municipality has a population of 30 inhabitants.

Lagueruela is located in the Sierra de Cucalón area, in the high course of the Huerva River.

See also
Jiloca Comarca
List of municipalities in Teruel

References

Municipalities in the Province of Teruel